Rogério Luiz da Silva (born June 12, 1980), commonly known as Rogério, is a footballer from Brazil who since 2009 has played as a forward for Grasshopper-Club Zurich in the Swiss Super League.

Career 
After three seasons at FC Aarau, da Silva returned to Grasshopper-Club Zurich and has signed until June 2010. Rogério had previously played for Grasshopper-Club Zurich from 2004 to 2006.

External links
FC Aarau profile

1980 births
Living people
Brazilian footballers
Brazilian expatriate footballers
Expatriate footballers in Switzerland
FC Aarau players
FC Wil players
Grasshopper Club Zürich players
Swiss Super League players

Association football forwards